Getov is a Bulgarian masculine surname, its feminine counterpart is Getova. It may refer to
Plamen Getov (born 1959), Bulgarian football player
Preslav Getov (born 1965), Bulgarian football player
Venera Getova (born 1980), Bulgarian discus thrower

Bulgarian-language surnames